Bucheon Stadium Station is a subway station on Seoul Subway Line 7. It will become a transfer station to the Seohae Line in January 2023.

Station layout

Railway stations opened in 2012
Seoul Metropolitan Subway stations
Metro stations in Bucheon